Laut Kecil Islands is an archipelago in the south of Borneo. Administratively, the islands belong to South Kalimantan province of Indonesia. The main islands include Matasiri, Kalambau, and Kadapongan.

Archipelagoes of Indonesia
Populated places in Indonesia